Harold Holt Rippon (23 February 1874 – 16 January 1917) was an Australian rules footballer who played with Melbourne and South Melbourne in the Victorian Football League (VFL).

Family
The son of Samuel Rippon (1845-1897), and Lucretia Eliza Rippon (1848-1899), née Butterworth, Harold Holt Rippon was born at Abbotsford, Victoria on 23 February 1874.

His brothers, Les and Norm, also played for Melbourne in the VFL.

Football

Melbourne (VFL)
Rippon played in four senior games for Melbourne in 1898 -- including the match against St Kilda, at the Junction Oval, on 3 September 1898, where he appeared with both his brothers, Les and Norm -- and in one game, the match against St Kilda, at the Junction Oval on 5 May 1900, where he played as a replacement for his brother, Les.

South Melbourne (VFL)
In 1903 he was cleared from Melbourne to South Melbourne. He played in 5 senior games in 1903 -- in four of which his brother, Norm, also played.

Cricket
He played Sub-District Cricket for the Caulfield Cricket Club.

Military service
He was a private in the 2nd Pioneer Battalion during World War I.

Death
He died on 16 January 1917 from the wounds he sustained on 14 January 1917, while fighting in the Western Front.

Burial
He is buried at Heilly Station Cemetery, Mericourt-L'Abbe.

See also
 List of Victorian Football League players who died on active service

Notes

References
 Holmesby, Russell & Main, Jim (2014), The Encyclopedia of AFL Footballers: every AFL/VFL player since 1897 (10th ed.), Melbourne, Victoria: Bas Publishing. 
 First World War Embarkation Roll: Private Harold Holt Rippon (2158), Collection of the Australian War Memorial.
 First World War Nominal Roll: Private Harold Holt Rippon (2158), Collection of the Australian War Memorial.
 First World War Service Record: Private Harold Holt Rippon (2158), National Archives of Australia.
 Roll of Honour Circular: Private Harold Holt Rippon (2158), Collection of the Australian War Memorial.
 Roll of Honour: Private Harold Holt Rippon (2158), Australian War Memorial.

External links
 
 
 Harold Rippon at Demonwiki.

1874 births
1917 deaths
Melbourne Football Club players
Sydney Swans players
Australian military personnel killed in World War I
Australian rules footballers from Melbourne
Military personnel from Melbourne
People from Abbotsford, Victoria